Dyspessa affinis is a species of moth of the family Cossidae. It is found in Kazakhstan and Uzbekistan.

References

Dyspessa
Moths described in 1912
Moths of Asia